KGKC-LD (channel 39) is a low-power television station licensed to Lawrence, Kansas, United States, serving the Kansas City metropolitan area as an affiliate of the Spanish-language Telemundo network. Owned by SagamoreHill Broadcasting, the station has studios on West 9th Street in downtown Kansas City, Missouri, and its transmitter is located in the city's Brown Estates section.

KGKC-LD's primary channel is simulcast on semi-satellite KGKM-LD (channel 36) in Columbia, Missouri, serving the Mid-Missouri market.

History
The station became a Telemundo affiliate in September 2018. Prior to that, it aired Spanish-language religious programming.

Subchannels
The station's digital signal is multiplexed:

References

External links

Telemundo network affiliates
Start TV affiliates
TeleXitos affiliates
Low-power television stations in the United States
Television channels and stations established in 2008
2008 establishments in Kansas
Television stations in the Kansas City metropolitan area
SagamoreHill Broadcasting